Christopher Matthew Cook is an American actor who portrayed Licari in Season 5 of AMC's The Walking Dead. He is also known for Dog Eat Dog and Hours.

Filmography

Movies

Television

References

External links 
 Twitter
 
 

Place of birth missing (living people)
Living people
American male film actors
American male television actors
Year of birth missing (living people)
21st-century American male actors